After the re-introduction of Formation Badges by the British Army in 1941, the Canadian Army followed suit.  The 2nd Canadian Infantry Division used a "battle patch" system of geometric shapes identifying individual brigades and battalions, similar to that used by the 2nd Canadian Division in the First World War, during the 1941-42 period, but abandoned this system after the Dieppe Raid.

Other Canadian divisions used plain formation patches, and separate unit titles.".

References

External links

 CanadianSoldiers.com: First Canadian Army webpage
 Veterans Affairs Canada: The First Canadian Army in WWII  
 Juno Beach Centre.org: First Canadian Army on 8 May 1945

Canadian Army
Army units and formations of Canada in World War II
Canadian military uniforms
Canada, Army